Pyrgos is a small village in Boeotia, possible site of Homeric Nisa (Iliad 2.508).  It is named after a ruined medieval tower, with a notable Mycenaean element, that overlooks the village from a nearby hill. The hill is dedicated to Aiya Marina Pyrgos, or St. Marina of Pyrgos. The town forms part of the municipality of Orchomenos.

Notes

External links

Populated places in Boeotia